Ian Michael Jones (born 26 August 1976) is a German-born footballer who played as a defender for Cardiff City. He made three appearances for the club in the Football League and also played for Wales at youth level. He subsequently joined non-league Merthyr Tydfil.

References

1976 births
Living people
Welsh footballers
Cardiff City F.C. players
Wales youth international footballers
Association football defenders